Cape du Couedic is a headland in the Australian state of South Australia located on the southwest tip of Kangaroo Island in the locality of Flinders Chase. It was named after a French naval officer, by the Baudin expedition to Australia during January 1803. It is the site for the Cape du Couedic Lighthouse. It is currently located within the Flinders Chase National Park.

Description
It is the termination for a pair of coastlines - the western coastline extending from Cape Borda in the north and the southern coastline extending from Cape Willoughby in the east. It is described as "a narrow promontory about 1 mile long" (i.e. ) and that "its SW face slopes to the sea whereas its N and S sides are steep."

Formation, geology & oceanography 
Cape du Couedic was formed when the sea reached its present level 7,500 years ago after sea levels started to rise at the start of the Holocene. The cliff line which includes Cape du Couedic consists of a metamorphic rock belonging to the Kanmantoo group bedrock called Middleton Sandstone.
 Cape du Couedic is one of twenty geological features on Kangaroo Island that have been listed as a geological monument by the Geological Society of Australia.

History

Aboriginal use
Aboriginal sites have been identified by the South Australian Museum at Cape du Couedic. As of 1999, radiocarbon dating of material recovered via archaeological excavation from sites at Cape du Couedic and Rocky River suggest Aboriginal presence in the western end of Kangaroo Island from approximately 7,500 years BP to as recent as 350–400 years BP.

European discovery
Cape du Couedic was named in January 1803 by the Baudin expedition of 1800-03 in the memory of Charles Louis Chevalier du Couëdic de Kergoualer (1740–1780), a French naval officer, who commanded the frigate La Surveilante and who died in 1780 as the result of wounds received in the action of 6 October 1779 against HMS Quebec.

Navigation aid

The loss of both Loch Vennachar and Loch Sloy convinced the Marine Board of South Australia to argue for the bringing forward of a plan that it recommended in 1902 to build a lighthouse at Cape du Couedic. Its view was that the loss of both ships could have been avoided if a lighthouse had been operating at Cape du Couedic. Construction commenced in 1907 and the light was officially lit on 27 June 1909.

Protected area status
Cape du Couedic is currently located within the protected area known as the Flinders Chase National Park. As of 2012, the waters surrounding its shores are part of a combined restricted access and sanctuary zone located within the boundaries of the Western Kangaroo Island Marine Park.

Climate

See also
Casuarina Islets

References

d